The Cucurbitaceae, also called cucurbits or the gourd family, are a plant family consisting of about 965 species in around 95 genera. Those most important to humans are the following:
Cucurbita – squash, pumpkin, zucchini or courgette, some gourds
Lagenaria – calabash, and others that are inedible
Citrullus – watermelon (C. lanatus, C. colocynthis) and others
Cucumis – cucumber (C. sativus), various melons and vines
Momordica – bitter melon
Luffa – the common name is also luffa, sometimes spelled loofah (when fully ripened, two species of this fibrous fruit are the source of the loofah scrubbing sponge)
Cyclanthera – Caigua

The plants in this family are grown around the tropics and in temperate areas, where those with edible fruits were among the earliest cultivated plants in both the Old and New Worlds. The family Cucurbitaceae ranks among the highest of plant families for number and percentage of species used as human food. The name Cucurbitaceae comes to international scientific vocabulary from New Latin, from Cucurbita, the type genus, + -aceae, a standardized suffix for plant family names in modern taxonomy. The genus name comes from the Classical Latin word , meaning "gourd".

Description

Most of the plants in this family are annual vines, but some are woody lianas, thorny shrubs, or trees (Dendrosicyos). Many species have large, yellow or white flowers. The stems are hairy and pentangular. Tendrils are present at 90° to the leaf petioles at nodes. Leaves are exstipulate, alternate, simple palmately lobed or palmately compound. The flowers are unisexual, with male and female flowers on different plants (dioecious) or on the same plant (monoecious). The female flowers have inferior ovaries. The fruit is often a kind of modified berry called a pepo.

Fossil history
One of the oldest fossil cucurbits so far is †Cucurbitaciphyllum lobatum from the Paleocene epoch, found at Shirley Canal, Montana. It was described for the first time in 1924 by the paleobotanist Frank Hall Knowlton. The fossil leaf is palmate, trilobed with rounded lobal sinuses and an entire or serrate margin. It has a leaf pattern similar to the members of the genera Kedrostis, Melothria and Zehneria.

Classification

Tribal classification

The most recent classification of Cucurbitaceae delineates 15 tribes:

 Tribe Gomphogyneae Benth. & Hook.f.
 Alsomitra (Blume) Spach (1 sp.)
 Bayabusua  (1 sp.)
 Gomphogyne Griff. (2 spp.)
 Gynostemma Blume (10 spp.)
 Hemsleya Cogn. ex F.B.Forbes & Hemsl. (30 spp.)
 Neoalsomitra Hutch. (12 spp.)
 Tribe Triceratieae A.Rich. 
 Anisosperma Silva Manso (1 sp.)
 Cyclantheropsis Harms (3 spp.)
 Fevillea L. (8 spp.)
 Pteropepon (Cogn.) Cogn. (5 spp.)
 Sicydium Schltdl. (7 spp.)
 Tribe Zanonieae Benth. & Hook.f.
 Gerrardanthus Harvey in Hook.f. (3–5 spp.)
 Siolmatra Baill. (1 sp.)
 Xerosicyos Humbert (5 spp.)
 Zanonia L. (1 sp.)
 Tribe Actinostemmateae H.Schaef. & S.S.Renner
 Actinostemma Griff. (3 spp.)
 Tribe Indofevilleeae H.Schaef. & S.S.Renner
 Indofevillea Chatterjee (2 sp.)
 Tribe Thladiantheae H.Schaef. & S.S.Renner
 Baijiania A.M.Lu & J.Q.Li (30 spp.)
 Thladiantha Bunge 1833 (5 spp.)
 Tribe Siraitieae H. Schaef. & S.S. Renner
 Siraitia Merr. (3–4 spp.)
 Tribe Momordiceae H.Schaef. & S.S.Renner
 Momordica L. (60 spp.)
 Tribe Joliffieae Schrad. 
 Ampelosicyos Thouars (5 spp.)
 Cogniauxia Baill. (2 spp.)
 Telfairia Hook. (3 spp.)
 Tribe Bryonieae Dumort.
 Austrobryonia H.Schaef. (4 spp.)
 Bryonia L. (10 spp.)
 Ecballium A.Rich. (1 sp.)
 Tribe Schizopeponeae C.Jeffrey
 Herpetospermum Wall. ex Hook.f. (3 spp.)
 Schizopepon Maxim. (6–8 spp.)
 Tribe Sicyoeae Schrad.
 Cyclanthera Schrad. (40 spp.)
 Echinocystis Torr. & A.Gray (1 sp.)
 Echinopepon Naudin (20 spp., including Brandegea Cogn.)
 Frantzia Pittier (5 spp.)
 Hanburia Seem. (7 spp.)
 Hodgsonia Hook.f. & Thomson (2 spp.)
 Linnaeosicyos H.Schaef. & Kocyan (1 sp.)
 Luffa Mill. (5–7 spp.)
 Marah Kellogg (7 spp.)
 Nothoalsomitra Hutch. (1 sp.)
 Sicyos L. (75 spp., including Sechium P.Browne)
 Trichosanthes L. (≤100 spp.)
 Tribe Coniandreae Endl.
 Apodanthera Arn. (16 spp.)
 Bambekea Cogn. (1 sp.)
 Ceratosanthes Adans. (4 spp.)
 Corallocarpus Welw. ex Benth. & Hook.f. (17 spp.)
 Cucurbitella Walp. (1 sp.)
 Dendrosicyos Balf.f. (1 sp.)
 Doyerea Grosourdy (1 sp.)
 Eureiandra Hook.f. (8 spp.)
 Gurania (Schltdl.) Cogn. (37 spp.)
 Halosicyos Mart.Crov (1 sp.)
 Helmontia Cogn. (2–4 spp.)
 Ibervillea Greene (9–10 spp.)
 Kedrostis Medik. (28 spp.)
 Melotrianthus M.Crovetto (1–3 spp.)
 Psiguria Neck. ex Arn. (6–12 spp.)
 Seyrigia Keraudren (6 spp.)
 Trochomeriopsis Cogn. (1 sp.)
 Tumamoca Rose (2 spp.)
 Wilbrandia Silva Manso (5 spp.)
 Tribe Benincaseae Ser.
 Acanthosicyos Welw. ex Hook.f. (1 sp.)
 Benincasa Savi (2 spp., including Praecitrullus Pangalo)
 Borneosicyos  (1–2 spp.)
 Cephalopentandra Chiov. (1 sp.)
 Citrullus Schrad. (4 spp.)
 Coccinia Wight & Arn. (30 spp.)
 Ctenolepis Hook. f. 1867 (3 spp.)
 Cucumis L. (65 spp.)
 Dactyliandra Hook.f.  (2 spp.)
 Diplocyclos (Endl.) T.Post & Kuntze (4 spp.)
 Indomelothria  (2 spp.)
 Khmeriosicyos  (1 sp.)
 Lagenaria Ser. (6 spp.)
 Lemurosicyos Keraudren (1 sp.)
 Melothria L. (12 spp., including M. scabra)
 Muellerargia Cogn. (2 sp.)
 Papuasicyos  (8 spp.)
 Peponium Engl. (20 spp.)
 Raphidiocystis Hook.f. (5 spp.)
 Ruthalicia C.Jeffrey (2 spp.)
 Scopellaria W.J.de Wilde & Duyfjes (2 spp.)
 Solena Lour. (3 spp.)
 Trochomeria Hook.f. (8 spp.)
 Zehneria Endl. (ca. 60 spp.)
 Tribe Cucurbiteae Ser.
 Abobra Naudin (1 sp.)
 Calycophysum H.Karst. & Triana (5 spp.)
 Cayaponia Silva Manso (50–59 spp., including Selysia Cogn.)
 Cionosicys Griseb. (4–5 spp.)
 Cucurbita L. (15 spp.)
 Penelopeia Urb. (2 spp.)
 Peponopsis Naudin (1 sp.)
 Polyclathra Bertol. (6 spp.)
 Schizocarpum Schrad. (11 spp.)
 Sicana Naudin (4 spp.)
 Tecunumania Standl. & Steyerm. (1 sp.)

Systematics
Modern molecular phylogenetics suggest the following relationships:

Pests and diseases
Sweet potato whitefly is the vector of a number of cucurbit viruses that cause yellowing symptoms throughout the southern United States.

References

Further reading

External links
 Cucurbitaceae in T.C. Andres (1995 onwards).
 Cucurbitaceae in L. Watson and M.J. Dallwitz (1992 onwards). The families of flowering plants: descriptions, illustrations, identification, information retrieval.

 
Rosid families
Extant Danian first appearances
Taxa named by Antoine Laurent de Jussieu
Taxa described in 1789